Stawell was an electoral district of the Legislative Assembly in the Australian state of Victoria from 1877 to 1904. It centred on the town of Stawell in western Victoria.

Members

After Stawell was abolished in 1904 along with the Electoral district of Ararat, the two districts were combined to create the district of Stawell and Ararat.

References

Former electoral districts of Victoria (Australia)
1877 establishments in Australia
1904 disestablishments in Australia